Adv. Shivajirao Shivaramji Moghe is an Indian politician. He is the Indian National Congress Party member of the Maharashtra Legislative Assembly representing Arni, Yavatmal.
Adv. Shivajirao Moghe is a senior from Maharashtra and is a committed tribal leader.

He was earlier elected as Member of Legislative Assembly of Maharashtra for Kelapur in 1980, 1985,1999 & 2009 as Indian National Congress candidate and 1995 as Independent.

References

Living people
Marathi politicians
People from Yavatmal district
Year of birth missing (living people)
Maharashtra MLAs 1980–1985
Maharashtra MLAs 1985–1990
Maharashtra MLAs 1995–1999
Maharashtra MLAs 1999–2004
Maharashtra MLAs 2009–2014
Indian National Congress politicians
Indian National Congress politicians from Maharashtra